James "Jim" Sellar (born ) is a Scottish and British wheelchair curler.

At the international level he is a  curler and two-time bronze medallist (2002, 2007). As a member of Great Britain team he participated in the 2010 Winter Paralympics.

At the national level he is a six-time Scottish wheelchair champion curler (2006, 2010, 2015, 2016, 2017, 2018).

He also competes at World level in bowls and coaches in both sports.

Teams

References

External links 

Profile at the Official Website for the 2010 Winter Paralympics in Vancouver

Living people
1957 births
Scottish male curlers
Scottish wheelchair curlers
Scottish Paralympic competitors
Wheelchair curlers at the 2010 Winter Paralympics
World wheelchair curling champions
Scottish wheelchair curling champions
Scottish male bowls players
Place of birth missing (living people)